The dead-end elimination algorithm (DEE) is a method for minimizing a function over a discrete set of independent variables.  The basic idea is to identify "dead ends", i.e., combinations of variables that are not necessary to define a global minimum because there is always a way of replacing such combination by a better or equivalent one. Then we can refrain from searching such combinations further. Hence, dead-end elimination is a mirror image of dynamic programming, in which "good" combinations are identified and explored further. 

Although the method itself is general, it has been developed and applied mainly to the problems of predicting and designing the structures of proteins. It closely related to the notion of dominance in optimization also known as substitutability in a Constraint Satisfaction Problem.

Basic requirements
An effective DEE implementation requires four pieces of information:
 A well-defined finite set of discrete independent variables
 A precomputed numerical value (considered the "energy") associated with each element in the set of variables (and possibly with their pairs, triples, etc.)
 A criterion or criteria for determining when an element is a "dead end", that is, when it cannot possibly be a member of the solution set
 An objective function (considered the "energy function") to be minimized

Note that the criteria can easily be reversed to identify the maximum of a given function as well.

Applications to protein structure prediction
Dead-end elimination has been used effectively to predict the structure of side chains on a given protein backbone structure by minimizing an energy function .  The dihedral angle search space of the side chains is restricted to a discrete set of rotamers for each amino acid position in the protein (which is, obviously, of fixed length). The original DEE description included criteria for the elimination of single rotamers and of rotamer pairs, although this can be expanded.

In the following discussion, let  be the length of the protein and let  represent the rotamer of the  side chain.  Since atoms in proteins are assumed to interact only by two-body potentials, the energy may be written

Where  represents the "self-energy" of a particular rotamer , and  represents the "pair energy" of the rotamers .

Also note that  (that is, the pair energy between a rotamer and itself) is taken to be zero, and thus does not affect the summations. This notation simplifies the description of the pairs criterion below.

Singles elimination criterion

If a particular rotamer  of sidechain  cannot possibly give a better energy than another rotamer  of the same sidechain, then rotamer A can be eliminated from further consideration, which reduces the search space.  Mathematically, this condition is expressed by the inequality

where  is the minimum (best) energy possible between rotamer  of sidechain  and any rotamer X of side chain .  Similarly,  is the maximum (worst) energy possible between rotamer  of sidechain  and any rotamer X of side chain .

Pairs elimination criterion

The pairs criterion is more difficult to describe and to implement, but it adds significant eliminating power.

Expressed mathematically,

Energy matrices
For large , the matrices of precomputed energies can become costly to store. Let  be the number of amino acid positions, as above, and let  be the number of rotamers at each position (this is usually, but not necessarily, constant over all positions). This makes the total number of entries in an unreduced pair matrix . This can be trimmed somewhat, at the cost of additional complexity in implementation, because pair energies are symmetrical and the pair energy between a rotamer and itself is zero.

Implementation and efficiency
The above two criteria are normally applied iteratively until convergence, defined as the point at which no more rotamers or pairs can be eliminated. Since this is normally a reduction in the sample space by many orders of magnitude, simple enumeration will suffice to determine the minimum within this pared-down set.

Given this model, it is clear that the DEE algorithm is guaranteed to find the optimal solution; that is, it is a global optimization process. The single-rotamer search scales quadratically in time with total number of rotamers. The pair search scales cubically and is the slowest part of the algorithm (aside from energy calculations).

A large-scale benchmark of DEE compared with alternative methods of protein structure prediction and design finds that DEE reliably converges to the optimal solution for protein lengths for which it runs in a reasonable amount of time. It significantly outperforms the alternatives under consideration, which involved techniques derived from mean field theory, genetic algorithms, and the Monte Carlo method. However, the other algorithms are appreciably faster than DEE and thus can be applied to larger and more complex problems; their relative accuracy can be extrapolated from a comparison to the DEE solution within the scope of problems accessible to DEE.

Protein design

The preceding discussion implicitly assumed that the rotamers  are all different orientations of the same amino acid side chain. That is, the sequence of the protein was assumed to be fixed. It is also possible to allow multiple side chains to "compete" over a position  by including both types of side chains in the set of rotamers for that position. This allows a novel sequence to be designed onto a given protein backbone. A short zinc finger protein fold has been redesigned this way. However, this greatly increases the number of rotamers per position and still requires a fixed protein length.

Generalizations
More powerful and more general criteria have been introduced that improve both the efficiency and the eliminating power of the method for both prediction and design applications. One example is a refinement of the singles elimination criterion known as the Goldstein criterion, which arises from fairly straightforward algebraic manipulation before applying the minimization:

References

  Desmet J, de Maeyer M, Hazes B, Lasters I. (1992). The dead-end elimination theorem and its use in protein side-chain positioning. Nature, 356, 539-542. .
  Voigt CA, Gordon DB, Mayo SL. (2000). Trading accuracy for speed: A quantitative comparison of search algorithms in protein sequence design. J Mol Biol  299(3):789-803.
  Dahiyat BI, Mayo SL. (1997). De novo protein design: fully automated sequence selection. Science 278(5335):82-7.
  Goldstein RF. (1994). Efficient rotamer elimination applied to protein side-chains and related spin glasses. Biophys J 66(5):1335-40.
  Pierce NA, Spriet JA, Desmet J, Mayo SL. (2000). Conformational splitting: a more powerful criterion for dead-end elimination. J Comput Chem 21: 999-1009.

Mathematical optimization
Protein methods